Sciellin is a protein that in humans is encoded by the SCEL gene.

The protein encoded by this gene is a precursor to the cornified envelope of terminally differentiated keratinocytes. This protein localizes to the periphery of cells and may function in the assembly or regulation of proteins in the cornified envelope. Transcript variants encoding different isoforms exist. A transcript variant utilizing an alternative polyA signal has been described in the literature, but its full-length nature has not been determined.

References

Further reading